Fort Saint Jacques, Fort Rupert, or Fort Charles was a fur trading post on James Bay at the mouth of the Rupert River. It was located in what is now Waskaganish, Nord-du-Québec region, Quebec, Canada.

Fort Charles was founded in 1668 in northern western Quebec on the James Bay, at the mouth of the Rupert River. It was the first Hudson’s Bay Company post by the Médard des Groseilliers. It was the first European settlement in northern Canada. The fort was captured by the French in 1686, and remained under their control until 1713, during which period it was called Fort Saint Jacques. When returned to English control, it became Rupert House, and later Fort Rupert.

References

See also

 Treaty of Utrecht
 Treaty of Ryswick

Saint Jacques
Forts in Quebec
1668 establishments in the British Empire